How I Feel may refer to:

 How I Feel (album), a 1998 album by Terri Clark
 "How I Feel" (Flo Rida song), 2013
 "How I Feel" (Martina McBride song), 2007
 "How I Feel", a song by Kelly Clarkson from My December